The 2015 NBA Development League expansion draft was the eighth expansion draft of the National Basketball Association Development League (D-League). The draft was held on August 20, 2015, so that the newly founded Raptors 905 could acquire players for the upcoming 2015–16 season. The 16 players were chosen from a pool of unprotected players among the league's teams. Each returning D-League team could protect up to 12 of their players from being selected.

Three of the players that the Raptors chose had previously been named NBA D-League All-Stars: Dee Bost, Kevin Jones, and Mustafa Shakur. Five additional players had also been previously selected in an NBA draft: Dahntay Jones (2003), Earl Clark (2009),  Luke Harangody (2010), Nolan Smith (2011), Ricky Ledo (2013).

Key

Draft

References
General

Specific

draft
NBA G League expansion draft
Raptors 905